is a Japanese football player. She plays for Mynavi Sendai and Japan national team.

Club career
Miyazawa was born in Minamiashigara on November 28, 1999. After graduating from high school, she joined Nippon TV Beleza in 2018. She was selected Best Young Player Award in 2018 season.

National team career
In September 2016, Miyazawa was selected Japan U-17 national team for 2016 U-17 World Cup. She played at all 6 matches and Japan won the 2nd place. In August 2018, she was selected Japan U-20 national team for 2018 U-20 World Cup. She played at all 6 matches. At final against Spain, she scored an opening goal and Japan won the championship.

November 11, 2018, she debuted for Japan national team against Norway.

National team statistics

International goals

References

External links 

Japan Football Association

1999 births
Living people
People from Minamiashigara, Kanagawa
Association football people from Kanagawa Prefecture
Japanese women's footballers
Japan women's international footballers
Nadeshiko League players
WE League players
Nippon TV Tokyo Verdy Beleza players
Mynavi Vegalta Sendai Ladies players
Women's association football midfielders